Albert Garnikovich Yavuryan (August 26, 1935, Gyumri, Armenia – November 3, 2007, Yerevan, Armenia) is an Armenian film producer.

Biography
He graduated from the Moscow All-Union Film Institute. Yavuryan was awarded the Movses Khorenatsi Medal in 1999 and the Merited Artist of Armenia.  Ashik Kerib was one of his films.

Death
Serzh Sargsyan, president of Armenia made a comment on Yavuryan's death, on November 3, 2007.

Albert Yavuryan's funeral was held on November 6, 2007 at the Komitas Chamber Music Hall, funerals, Yerevan City Pantheon.

See also
Armenfilm

References

External links

1935 births
Soviet cinematographers
People from Gyumri
Armenian cinematographers
2007 deaths